Lökbatan Mud Volcano, also known as Lok-Batan Mud Cone, is a mud volcano located in Absheron Peninsula near the settlement of Lökbatan in Qaradağ raion of Baku, Azerbaijan. The mud volcano erupted in 1977 and again on October 10, 2001, when it produced large flames many tens of meters high. Since 1998. the area has been submitted to UNESCO's World Heritage Site tentative list.

References

Mud volcanoes of Azerbaijan
Tourist attractions in Azerbaijan